JMA may refer to:
 Japan Medical Association
 Japan Meteorological Agency, Japanese government agency that researches natural phenomena
 Jaish al-Muhajireen wal-Ansar, Islamist jihadist group fighting in the Syrian Civil War against the government.
 Jimmy Miranda Award